Until Money Departs You is a 1960 West German drama film directed by Alfred Vohrer and starring Luise Ullrich, Gert Fröbe and Corny Collins.

It was shot at the Spandau Studios in Berlin and on location in Salzburg and Bavaria's Walchensee. The film's sets were designed by the art directors Erich Kettelhut and Johannes Ott.

Cast
 Luise Ullrich as Lisbeth Grapsch
 Gert Fröbe as Jupp Grapsch
 Corny Collins as Heidi Grapsch
 Wolfgang Lukschy as Robert Grothe
 Christiane Nielsen as Nina Sonntag
 Leon Askin as Dr. Plauert
 Hans Hessling as Dr. Giller
 Herbert Tiede as Fritz Hassen
 Peter Parak as Poldi
 Friedrich Schoenfelder as Richter
 Hugo Schrader as Krause
 Monika John as Else Langhans
 Marielouise Nagel
 Edith Schollwer
 Tilo von Berlepsch as Dr. Stumpf

References

Bibliography
 Parish, Robert. Film Actors Guide. Scarecrow Press, 1977.

External links 
 

1960 films
1960 drama films
German drama films
West German films
1960s German-language films
Films directed by Alfred Vohrer
Adultery in films
Films about divorce
Constantin Film films
Films shot at Spandau Studios
1960s German films